Charles Anthony "Tony" Pittman (born August 5, 1971 in Baltimore, Maryland) is an American former college football player. He was a 2nd Team All-Big Ten cornerback at Penn State after graduating from Phillips Academy in 1990. Pittman grew up in Erie, Pennsylvania and also attended McDowell High School, where he would have been in the 1989 graduation class had he not transferred to Phillips Academy.

Collegiate career
Recruited out of Phillips Academy in Andover, Massachusetts, Pittman was a member of Joe Paterno's 1990 recruiting class, which also included Kerry Collins and Kyle Brady.

Pittman was the 1993 recipient of the Jim O'Hora Award. Each year, the award is presented to a defensive Penn State Nittany Lions football player for "exemplary conduct, loyalty, interest, attitude, and improvement" during spring practice each year. The award honors former Nittany Lion assistant coach Jim O'Hora who served the team for 31 years before retiring in 1977.

Pittman led the Nittany Lions in interceptions in 1993 with 5 and started all 12 games at cornerback for the undefeated, Rose Bowl championship team in 1994.

Father/son connections
Pittman's father Charlie Pittman starred as an All-American running back on the undefeated Penn State teams of 1968-1969.

Father and son were both starters for the Nittany Lions, and both wore jersey number 24. Despite playing on three of Joe Paterno's five undefeated teams, both were denied national championships that could have been awarded to their teams but were instead given to other squads.

Neither Tony Pittman nor Charlie Pittman ever lost a game they started while at Penn State. Their combined college records were 45-0-1. New York Giants general manager Ernie Accorsi, who spent decades guiding NFL teams noted, “it’s unprecedented; it’s hard to believe that record for a father and son at the same university—and the son played in the Big Ten—that is something mind-boggling.”

Personal
In 2007, he teamed up with his father Charlie to write Playing for Paterno, about their shared experiences as the first father/son to play for the legendary coach.

Pittman and co-host Phil Collins (a former teammate) created, produced and hosted "The Penn State Football Podcast" from 2005 - 2013. 

He is on Twitter: @tonypittman - https://twitter.com/tonypittman

References

 https://www.amazon.com/Playing-Paterno-Coach-Father-Recollections/dp/1600780008
 https://www.pennlive.com/joehermitt/2014/09/penn_state_football_honors_und.html
 https://www.pennlive.com/sports/erry-2018/06/fdf89143ee260/a_penn_state_fathers_day_look.html
 https://www.youtube.com/watch?v=A26bGnyN5AQ
 https://thefootballletter.com/tag/tony-pittman/

External links
"Lions' Pittman hopes to duplicate father's success", The Daily Collegian, September 19, 1994
"Pittman NFF National Scholar-Athlete", footballfoundation.org
 "Pittman Selected to 1990's All Decade Team",NittanyAnthology.com
 

1971 births
Living people
American football defensive backs
American memoirists
American podcasters
Penn State Nittany Lions football players
Sportspeople from Erie, Pennsylvania
Players of American football from Baltimore
Players of American football from Pennsylvania